Several Green Bay Packers cheerleading squads have performed in Green Bay Packers' history.  The Packers became one of the first professional football teams to have a cheerleading squad, having first used cheerleaders in 1931.  The squad performed for 57 years under three separate names.  In 1988, it was decided that the team would cease having a professional squad cheer for them.  Since 1988, the team uses collegiate squads in a limited role to cheer during home games.

Role
The cheerleaders squads have cheered for the National Football League team at home games in Green Bay and Milwaukee, Wisconsin. They occasionally represent the team at various functions, although since 1988 they have had a limited role compared to other professional cheer squads in the National Football League

History
The Packers became one of the first professional football teams to have cheerleaders in 1931 when they used the Green Bay East and West high schools' squads on the sidelines for several games.

Packers coach Vince Lombardi notified Mary Jane Sorgel that he wanted her to organize a professional cheerleading squad. Lombardi wasn't clear about exactly what he wanted, but he was clear about what he didn't want. "We weren't the Dallas Cowgirls," said Sorgel. "We were wholesome Midwest girls, because Vince Lombardi did not like real short skirts. He liked the girls to be more modest, so that's the way we were."

The first professional squad was named the Green Bay Packerettes. They were later renamed the Golden Girls, renamed back to the Packerettes, and later the Green Bay Sideliners. The Packers last had professional cheerleaders in 1988. Green Bay television station WFRV did a poll and found that approximately 50% of fans wanted cheerleaders and 50% did not. Packers Vice President Bob Harlan issued a press release, stating "In general terms, the poll disclosed there were as many fans who expressed opposition to the return of the cheerleaders as there were those in favor of restoring them. On that basis, we felt the appropriate decision at this time would be to continue without them."  College cheerleaders now cheer on the sidelines for the team.

Green Bay Packerettes
The Green Bay Packers cheer squad was first named the Green Bay Packerettes and was organized by Bernie Matzke. She formed a squad of baton twirlers at the request of Wilbur Burke who ran Green Bay Packers Lumberjack band. The squad under this name was active in the 1950s while the Packers played at City Stadium.

Golden Girls
The team took their name from Paul Hornung's nickname "The Golden Boy." They were founded in 1961 by national champion baton twirler Mary Jane Sorgel and they lasted until she got engaged in 1972. The first squad consisted of sixteen students from Sorgel's dance studios around northeast Wisconsin doing routines designed by her. "The girls I had on the field did more than just cheering," Sorgel said. "They did tumbling, I had some national baton twirling champions and dancers, and of course the pom girls. We were very colorful." 1970 squad member Anne Maedke described their routine, "The Golden Girls did skits, dance routines – twirling and tumbling and acrobatic type things – in one-piece sequined swimsuits and high-heeled boots during breaks." The Golden Girls cheered during the Ice Bowl. The Golden Girls were honored by the team with a permanent installation at the Green Bay Packers Hall of Fame in May 2007.

Green Bay Packerettes return
In 1973, the Green Bay Packers changed the name of the squad back to the Green Bay Packerettes and recruited Matzke back as their leader. The Packerettes performed at other events such as nursing homes, parades, and a show with Bob Hope at the Resch Center. The squad was active under this name until 1977.

Green Bay Sideliners
In 1977, the squad was again renamed to the Green Bay Sideliners.  They were an attempt to have a contemporary, dance-oriented cheer squad, choreographed by local dance studio owner Shirley Van. They were disbanded in 1988.

Collegiate cheerleaders
The Packers had the University of Wisconsin–Green Bay (UWGB) cheerleaders cheer after they no longer had professional cheerleaders. The team currently uses college cheerleading squads, with the UWGB squad (coed) and St. Norbert's (all girl) cheering at each home game.

References

External links

History of the Green Bay Packers
National Football League cheerleading squads
Culture of Green Bay, Wisconsin
Performing groups established in 1950
1950 establishments in Wisconsin
History of women in Wisconsin